Markarov is a surname, with its female form being Markarova. Notable people with the surname include:

Aleksandr Markarov (born 1950), Russian professional football coach
Boris Markarov (born 1935), Russian water polo player
Eduard Markarov (born 1942), Soviet footballer
Nikolay Markarov (1933–2008), Soviet Russian artist and sculptor
Oksana Markarova (born 1976), Ukrainian politician and diplomat
Sergueï Markarov (born 1950), Soviet pianist and UNESCO Artist for Peace